Athos Costa (born November 29, 1988) is a Brazilian volleyball player who plays for Sporting CP.

References

1988 births
Living people
Brazilian sportspeople
Brazilian men's volleyball players
Sporting CP volleyball players